The Public Transport Authority (PTA) is a statutory authority that oversees the operation of all public transport in Western Australia.

History
The Public Transport Authority was formed on 1 July 2003 in accordance with the Public Transport Authority Act 2003 as the body overseeing the provision of public transport in Western Australia. It operates bus, ferry and train services in Perth under the Transperth brand, regional road coach and train services in regional Western Australia under the Transwa brand and manages school bus services.

Services
The Public Transport Authority runs many services. They are:
Transperth, operates bus, ferry and train services in metropolitan Perth
Transwa, operates regional road coach and train services in regional WA
TransAlbany, Albany bus services
TransBunbury, Bunbury bus services
TransBusselton, Busselton and Dunsborough bus services
TransGeraldton, Geraldton bus services
TransGoldfields, Kalgoorlie-Boulder bus services
TransHedland, Port Hedland bus services
TransKarratha, Karratha  bus services
Network and Infrastructure Division, making sure public transport infrastructure is safe
School Bus Services, providing school buses to children in rural and remote areas

SmartRider
The Public Transport Authority and Transperth introduced a smartcard, SmartRider, to replace MultiRiders from January 2007. This can be used on Transperth, TransAlbany, TransBunbury, TransBusselton, TransGeraldton and TransGoldfields services.

Chief Executive Officers
The head of the Public Transport Authority is the Chief Executive Officer. From 2010, the PTA CEO position has been held by the Director General - Transport.
Reece Waldock (1 July 2003 – 29 July 2016)
Richard Sellers (July 2016–?)
Peter Woronzow (November 2021–)

References

External links
Public Transport Authority website

Intermodal transport authorities in Australia
Public transport in Western Australia
Railway infrastructure companies of Australia
Statutory agencies of Western Australia
Australian companies established in 2003
Railway companies established in 2003
Government railway authorities of Australia